The Association of Algerian Muslim Ulama (AOMA), commonly known as Jam'iyat al-'Ulama, was a cultural and religious movement in French Algeria.

History
The organisation was established in 1931 by Abdelhamid Ben Badis, with a leadership consisting largely of middle-class men, most of whom were Arab-speaking schoolteachers. It supported Islamic reformism and was strongly opposed to the marabouts. It opposed assimilation with the French, but did not support independence, instead supporting linguistic nationalism until 1955, when it backed the incipient National Liberation Front insurgency and played an important role: many of the Algerian militants in the war against France, such as Brahim Mezhoudi and Nacer Mohammedi, were either sympathetic to or linked to the Association. Despite this, the French authorities sought to closely control the organisation, eventually leading to it to form alliances with nationalist parties. In 1936 it formed the Algerian Muslim Congress (CMA) alongside the Algerian People's Party and the Federation of Elected Natives.

When Ben Badis died in 1940, Bachir Ibrahimi became AOMA president. It supported the Friends of the Manifesto and Liberty after its formation in 1944. In 1956 AOMA was dissolved by the French authorities.

Despite its dissolution in 1956, the AOMA's ideological contribution to Algeria's political scene was significant. Post-independence, both Ahmed Ben Bella and Houari Boumédiène used reformist Islam as a tool of political legitimacy; however, Islamism would challenge both regimes. The Association's impact on the political scene also contributed to the emergence of Al Qiyam in the mid 1960s (many of its members were from the association) which "presented itself as the inheritor of Ben Badis and his movement". This movement was the precursor to the Islamic Salvation Front.

References

Islamic organisations based in Algeria
1931 establishments in Algeria
1956 disestablishments in Algeria
Algerian nationalism